Friedrich Wilhelm "Will" Quadflieg (15 September 1914 – 27 November 2003) was a German actor from Oberhausen. He was the father of actor Christian Quadflieg. He is considered one of Germany's best post-war actors. One of his most widely recognized roles was in the title role in the 1960 film Faust. He also starred in a number of other roles.  Quadflieg died from pulmonary embolism.

Filmography 

1938: The Muzzle - Rabanus, maler
1940: Das Herz der Königin - Olivier
1940: Kora Terry - Michael Varany
1941: My Life for Ireland - Michael O'Brien jun
1942: Destiny - Dimo
1942: The Red Terror - Peter Aßmuss
1942: Der große Schatten - Robert Jürgensen
1944: Die Zaubergeige - Violinist Andreas Halm
1944: Philharmoniker - Alexander Schonath
1945: Anna Alt - Joachim Alt, ein Komponist
1950: The Lie - Harry Altenberger
1951: Die Tödlichen Träume - Winter / Barravas / Florestan
1951: Das ewige Spiel - Werner Donatus
1951: Dark Eyes - Fedor Varany
1952: The Forester's Daughter - Joseph Földessy aka Hauptmann Koltai
1953: Don't Forget Love - Paul Cornelius
1953: Heartbroken on the Moselle - Dr. Thomas Arend
1955: Lola Montès - Franz Liszt
1956: San Salvatore - Dr. Manfred Carrell
1960: Faust - Dr. Heinrich Faust / Dichter
1969: Kamasutra: Vollendung der Liebe - Narrator (voice)
1979-1994: Derrick (TV Series) - Prof. Braun-Gorres / Robert Schreiber
1981: Dantons Tod (TV Movie) - Thomas Payne
1986: The Journey - Vater Voss
1993:  (TV Mini-Series) - Herbert Sachs
1994: Der gute Merbach (TV Movie) - Clemens Merbach
1999: Dr. Robert Schumann, Teufelsromantiker (TV Movie) - Rezitator (final film role)

External links

Photographs of Will Quadflieg

1914 births
2003 deaths
Deaths from pulmonary embolism
German male film actors
German male stage actors
German male television actors
20th-century German male actors
People from the Rhine Province
Commanders Crosses of the Order of Merit of the Federal Republic of Germany
Recipients of the Federal Order of Merit who returned their decoration